Geir Pollestad (born 13 August 1978) is a Norwegian politician for the Centre Party.

Early life and education
Hailing from Høyland in Hå, Pollestad took lower secondary education in Nærbø and upper secondary education in Bryne, finishing in 1997. After one year at Stavanger University College he enrolled in law studies at the University of Bergen, graduating with the cand.jur. degree in 2006. During his last year of studying he was a board member of the Student Welfare Organisation in Bergen. After graduation, he worked one year as a junior solicitor in the law firm Projure Advokatfirma.

Politicial career

Early career

Parliament
He served as a deputy representative to the Parliament of Norway from Rogaland during the term 2001–2005, then from Hordaland during the term 2005–2009 and again from Rogaland during the term 2009–2013. 

He resigned as state secretary in October 2013, as he won a regular seat in Parliament in the 2013 general election.

Despite media reports stating that Pollestad was a relevant candidate for minister of agriculture or minister of trade and industry in the new government following the 2021 election, Pollestad was eventually not chosen to become a minister. Instead, he was elected the party's deputy parliamentary leader.

After Sigbjørn Gjelsvik was appointed minister of local government, Pollestad became his successor as the party's financial spokesperson on 27 April 2022.

On 31 January 2023, he became acting chair of the Standing Committee on Finance and Economic Affairs during Eigil Knutsen's leave.

Stoltenberg's cabinet
In 2007, during the reign of Stoltenberg's Second Cabinet, Pollestad was appointed political advisor in the Ministry of Local Government and Regional Development. In late 2007 he changed to the Ministry of Petroleum and Energy. In 2008, he was promoted to State Secretary in the same ministry. He served until October 2009, when he returned to Parliament, where he was a regular representative while Magnhild Meltveit Kleppa served in cabinet (until June 2012). In September 2012 he returned as State Secretary, this time in the Ministry of Transport and Communications.

References

1978 births
Living people
People from Hå
University of Bergen alumni
Rogaland politicians
Politicians from Bergen
Centre Party (Norway) politicians
Members of the Storting
Norwegian state secretaries
21st-century Norwegian politicians